An oxbow lake is a U-shaped lake or pool that forms when a wide meander of a river is cut off, creating a free-standing body of water.  In South Texas, oxbows left by the Rio Grande are called resacas.  In Australia, oxbow lakes are called billabongs.
The word "oxbow" can also refer to a U-shaped bend in a river or stream, whether or not it is cut off from the main stream.

Geology 

An oxbow lake forms when a meandering river erodes through the neck of one of its meanders. This takes place because meanders tend to grow and become more curved over time. The river then follows a shorter course that bypasses the meander. The entrances to the abandoned meander eventually silt up, forming an oxbow lake. Because oxbow lakes are stillwater lakes, with no current flowing through them, the entire lake gradually silts up, becoming a bog or swamp and then evaporating completely.
When a river reaches a low-lying plain, often in its final course to the sea or a lake, it meanders widely. In the vicinity of a river bend, deposition occurs on the convex bank (the bank with the smaller radius). In contrast, both lateral erosion and undercutting occur on the cut bank or concave bank (the bank with the greater radius). Continuous deposition on the convex bank and erosion of the concave bank of a meandering river cause the formation of a very pronounced meander with two concave banks getting closer. The narrow neck of land between the two neighboring concave banks is finally cut through, either by lateral erosion of the two concave banks or by the strong currents of a flood. When this happens a new, straighter river channel develops—and an abandoned meander loop, called a cutoff, forms. When deposition finally seals off the cutoff from the river channel, an oxbow lake forms. This process can occur over a time from a few years to several decades, and may sometimes become essentially static.

Gathering of erosion products near the concave bank and transporting them to the convex bank is the work of the secondary flow across the floor of the river in the vicinity of a river bend. The process of deposition of silt, sand and gravel on the convex bank is clearly illustrated in point bars.

The effect of the secondary flow can be demonstrated using a circular bowl.  Partly fill the bowl with water and sprinkle dense particles such as sand or rice into the bowl. Set the water into circular motion with one hand or a spoon. The dense particles quickly sweep into a neat pile in the center of the bowl. This is the mechanism that leads to the formation of point bars and contributes to the formation of oxbow lakes. The primary flow of water in the bowl is circular and the streamlines are concentric with the side of the bowl. However, the secondary flow of the boundary layer across the floor of the bowl is inward toward the center. The primary flow might be expected to fling the dense particles to the perimeter of the bowl, but instead the secondary flow sweeps the particles toward the center.

The curved path of a river around a bend makes the water's surface slightly higher on the outside of the bend than on the inside. As a result, at any elevation within the river, water pressure is slightly greater near the outside of the bend than on the inside. A pressure gradient toward the convex bank provides the centripetal force necessary for each parcel of water to follow its curved path.

The boundary layer that flows along the river floor does not move fast enough to balance the pressure gradient laterally across the river. It responds to this pressure gradient, and its velocity is partly downstream and partly across the river toward the convex bank.  As it flows along the floor of the river, it sweeps loose material toward the convex bank. This flow of the boundary layer is significantly different from the speed and direction of the primary flow of the river, and is part of the river's secondary flow.

River flood plains that contain rivers with a highly sinuous platform are populated by longer oxbow lakes than those with low sinuosity.  This is because rivers with high sinuosity have larger meanders, and greater opportunity for longer lakes to form. Rivers with lower sinuosity are characterized by fewer cutoffs and shorter oxbow lakes due to the shorter distance of their meanders.

Oxbow lake ecology 

Oxbow lakes form favorable habitats for wildlife communities. These often have unique characteristics. For example, the numerous oxbow lakes of the Amazon River are a favorable habitat for the giant river otter. Oxbow lakes may also be suitable locations for aquaculture.

Oxbow lakes contribute to the health of a river ecosystem by trapping sediments and agricultural runoff, thereby removing them from the main river flow. However, this is destructive of the oxbow lake ecosystem itself. Oxbow lakes are also vulnerable to heavy metal contamination from industrial sources.

Artificial oxbow lakes
Oxbow lakes may be formed when a river channel is straightened artificially to improve navigation or for flood alleviation. This occurred notably on the upper Rhine in Germany in the nineteenth century.

An example of an entirely artificial waterway with oxbows is the Oxford Canal in England.

Notable examples 
Bole and Burton Round in West Burton, Nottinghamshire, England are a good example of previous lakes in a close proximity to one another.
Cuckmere Haven in Sussex, England contains a widely meandering river with many oxbow lakes, often referred to in physical geography textbooks.
Halfmoon Lake in downtown Eau Claire, Wisconsin was formed due to a shift in the course of the Chippewa River, which now flows immediately to the south. 
Kanwar Lake Bird Sanctuary, India contains rare and endangered migratory birds and is one of Asia's largest oxbow lakes.
The Oxbow, a  bend in the Connecticut River, is disconnected at one end.
There are many oxbow lakes alongside the Mississippi River and its tributaries.  The largest oxbow lake in North America, Lake Chicot (located near Lake Village, Arkansas), was originally part of the Mississippi River, as was Horseshoe Lake, the namesake for the town of Horseshoe Lake, Arkansas.  Reelfoot Lake in west Tennessee is another notable oxbow lake; it was formed when the Mississippi River took a new channel following the 1811–12 New Madrid earthquakes.
The upper reaches of New Zealand's Taieri River has also cut a multitude of oxbow lakes in its upper course near the town of Paerau. Some of this area has been converted into water meadows.
 Vynthala Lake, Chalakudy, India is formed from a "cutoff" of the Chalakudy River which flows nearby.

There has also been a possible oxbow lake postulated in Saraswati Flumen near Ontario Lacus on Saturn's moon Titan.

See also 

 Anabranch
 Bayou
 Billabong
 Fallacy regarding formation of point bars
 Resaca (channel)
 Secondary flow around river bends

References

External links

NASA Remote Sensing Tutorial: Fluvial/Deltaic/Coastal Landforms (archived 12 March 2007)
Ox Bow Lake Formation, As Seen By the Google Earth Time Machine

 
Fluvial landforms
Lakes by type
Rivers